Carola is a female given name, the Latinized form of the Germanic given names Caroline or Carol. 

People named Carola include:

Acting 
Carola Braunbock (1924–1978), Czech-born East German actress
Carola Höhn (1910–2005), German actress
Carola Lotti (1910-1990), Italian actress
Carola Neher (Karola Neher), German actress
Carola Reyna, Argentine actress and director
Carola Toelle (1893–1958), German actress

Music
 Carola Grindea (1914–2009), Romanian pianist and piano teacher
 Carola Häggkvist, also known as just Carola, Swedish singer, winner of the 1991 Eurovision Song Contest
 Carola Smit, Dutch singer
 Carola Standertskjöld, Finnish jazz and pop singer

Politics 
 Carola Reimann (born 1967), German politician
 Carola Schouten, Dutch politician

Others
 Carola Dunn, British-American writer
 Carola Rackete, German ship captain and sea rescuer
 Carola Roloff, German Buddhist nun
 Carola Unterberger-Probst, Austrian filmmaker and artist
 Carola of Vasa, Queen of Saxony
 Carola, wife of Obelerio degli Antenori, dogaressa of Venice
 Carola Gräfin von Schmettow, German businesswoman

See also
 
 
 
 
Carl (name)
Carol (disambiguation)
Carolan (surname)
Caroly (name)
Karola

Feminine given names